Lexington Park is a census-designated place (CDP) in St. Mary's County, Maryland, United States, and the principal community of the Lexington Park, Maryland Micropolitan Statistical Area. The population was 11,626 at the 2010 census.

History

Native American presence

Archeological research in the county has shown that Native American peoples inhabited the area for at least 10,000 years. At the time of the arrival of the first colonists, the area was inhabited by the Yaocomico branch of the Piscataway Indian Nation. The Piscataway Nation, although fragmented, still exists today, and has small communities and cultural centers in other parts of the county.

Colonial era

The area was expanded into by "planters" (mostly tobacco farmers) who moved into the area as the original settlement in St. Mary's City grew. Early plantations were first farmed by indentured and free labor, but in the late 1600s slavery began to establish itself in Maryland and the character of farming changed due to this. Wealth was concentrated in very few hands and small free farmers and laborers were pushed out or "down" (into poverty) due to competition with slave labor.

Pre-1940s community

Before the establishment of the Patuxent Naval Air Station, there were tobacco farms in what is now Lexington Park, or the base proper, and also crabbing, fishing and oyster harvesting communities in the waterfront areas. Many residents of these communities had roots going back more than 300 years in the area. Many were pushed out by eminent domain land seizures during World War Two, in order to create the new military base. Memories of this loss are still strong among older county residents. The economic boost brought by the base was welcome, but many never felt sufficiently compensated for the loss of their centuries-old homes, landholdings and fishing and farming community.

Nearby, Dashiell Hammett, noted novelist, was born on May 27, 1894.

World War Two: Advent of naval base spurs establishment of "Lexington Park"

"Lexington Park" came into being in 1943 with the establishment of the Patuxent Naval Air Station during World War II, and was named for the recently sunk  aircraft carrier.  Prior to this Lexington Park was called "Jarboesville".  John Glenn, Alan Shepard, and many noted astronauts trained there.  In 1977 the Governor Thomas Johnson Bridge spanning the Patuxent River linked the area to Calvert County and Solomons, Maryland.

In recent years several aerospace and high-tech companies have located in the area bringing additional jobs.  Continually expanding shopping centers along Maryland Route 235 ("Three Notch Road") and Great Mills Road have many department stores.

Economy

Town

Lexington Park in seaside St. Mary's County is one of the nation's fastest-growing "micropolitan" areas, expanding by 14.6 percent since 2000, largely on the strength of military growth.  The county population has surpassed 100,000 in 2010.  In addition, Southern Maryland is the fast-growing area in the state, and a very desirable bedroom community for people who work in the District of Columbia, but unlike neighboring Charles and Calvert counties, many in St. Mary's County both work and live in the county.

Base

The Patuxent River Naval Air Station, which is based in Lexington Park, employs about 20,000 people, driving about 75 percent of the economy in St. Mary's County and providing roughly $3 billion to the state economy.

Civilian home prices

The average price of a home in St. Mary's County in 2014 is $252,100, compared with $337,501 in 2007, and about $200,000 in 2003.  The area is surrounded by farmland and has a countryside charm with a historical appeal.  In addition, there are many high tech jobs.

Area schools

Elementary and Secondary schools

Lexington Park's public schools are part of the St. Mary's County Public Schools. The schools in town include Town Creek Elementary, Greenview Knolls Elementary, Lexington Park Elementary, George Washington Carver Elementary, Esperanza Middle, and Spring Ridge Middle. Great Mills High, Chesapeake Public Charter, and Fairlead Academy are also close by in neighboring Great Mills.

Higher education

St. Mary's College of Maryland

St. Mary's College of Maryland is located seven miles south of Lexington Park and is one of only two public honors colleges in the nation.

It is ranked "5th in the nation" under the "public colleges" category by U.S. News & World Report.

It is also ranked "4th in the nation" under the category of "Best schools for veterans" by U.S. News & World Report.

College of Southern Maryland

The College of Southern Maryland, a community college, offers classes in and near the area.

Merchant Marine academy

The Paul Hall Center for Maritime Studies (a merchant marine academy) is only about 20 minutes away.

Notable historic sites

Archeological sites

Mattapany-Sewall Archeological Site was listed on the National Register of Historic Places in 1985.

Other archeological research is done periodically on parts of the naval base (and its adjacent waters), focusing on Civil War, War of 1812 and colonial research.

United States Colored Troops Memorial Statue

The United States Colored Troops Memorial Statue is located in Lexington Park. It is a nationally recognized memorial to the more than 700 African-American soldiers and sailors from St. Mary's County who served in the Union forces during the Civil War. The memorial also includes an educational display. Special celebrations are also held there each year.

The mission of the site is to welcome people of all backgrounds, to honor those who served and to tell their story. The memorial is located in John G. Lancaster Park on 21550 Willows Road.

St. Richards Manor

St. Richard's Manor was listed on the National Register of Historic Places in 1985.

Historic St. Mary's City

Historic St. Mary's City, seven miles south of Lexington Park, is the site of the founding of the Maryland colony as well as being recognized as the birthplace of religious freedom in America. It is now a reconstructed colonial town, a museum complex, and a center for living history. The Maryland Dove a full-sized working replica of the sailing ship that bore the firsts colonists to the new Maryland colony is there as well.

The complex shows what colonial life was like in what is now Lexington Park as well as both areas were originally part of the same settlement.

Geography
Lexington Park is located at  (38.258906, −76.450592).

Climate 
Lexington Park has a humid subtropical climate under the Köppen climate classification, with hot, humid summers and mild winters.

Demographics

As of the census of 2000, there were 11,021 people, 3,923 households, and 2,459 families residing in the CDP. The racial makeup of the CDP was 59.99% White, 30.00% African American, 0.38% Native American, 4.22% Asian, 0.12% Pacific Islander, 1.81% from other races, and 3.48% from two or more races. Hispanic or Latino of any race were 4.78% of the population.

There were 3,923 households, out of which 41.8% had children under the age of 18 living with them, 43.9% were married couples living together, 14.7% had a female householder with no husband present, and 37.3% were non-families. 29.5% of all households were made up of individuals, and 2.1% had someone living alone who was 65 years of age or older. The average household size was 2.65 and the average family size was 3.34.

In the CDP, the population was spread out, with 31.5% under the age of 18, 14.0% from 18 to 24, 39.3% from 25 to 44, 12.2% from 45 to 64, and 3.1% who were 65 years of age or older. The median age was 27 years. For every 100 females, there were 114.5 males. For every 100 females age 18 and over, there were 120.5 males.

The median income for a household in the CDP was $39,214, and the median income for a family was $42,095. Males had a median income of $30,762 versus $24,155 for females. The per capita income for the CDP was $17,605. About 9.9% of families and 11.9% of the population were below the poverty line, including 14.4% of those under age 18 and 10.6% of those age 65 or over.

References

External links

 PAX River Online - Area Community and Business Resource
 Southern Maryland Weather- Live Southern Maryland Weather Website
 Lexington Park Growth Puts It on National Fast Track - WTOP News

1943 establishments in Maryland
Census-designated places in St. Mary's County, Maryland
Census-designated places in Maryland
Maryland populated places on the Chesapeake Bay
Populated places established in 1943